The Tyrone Generating Station was a coal-fired power plant owned and operated by Kentucky Utilities near Versailles, Kentucky. It is located 15 miles west of Lexington, Kentucky. It was retired in 2016 and demolished in 2019.

According to Kentucky Utilities, the plant's owner's website, it was retired in 2013.

Emissions data 
 CO2 emissions: 468,036 tons (2005)
 SO2 emissions: 3,192 tons (2005)
 SO2 emissions per MWh: 17.94 lb/MWh (2005)
 NOx emissions: 955 tons (2005)
 Mercury emissions:

See also 

Coal mining in Kentucky

References

External links 
 Official website

Energy infrastructure completed in 1947
Buildings and structures in Woodford County, Kentucky
Demolished buildings and structures in Kentucky
Buildings and structures demolished in 2019